Rodion Oslyabya was a Russian monk from Saint Sergius's Trinity Abbey who became famous for his part in the Battle of Kulikovo.
Most details of his life are legendary. According to a 15th-century source, he was a nobleman (boyar) rather than a monk. He fought in the Battle on Pyana River, in a rank of tysyachnik (leader of a thousand knights), and survived the defeat. According to hagiography, he accepted vows just prior to Battle of Kulikovo. His relative (some say brother) was Alexander Peresvet, although it is likely that this relationship is merely the product of later hagiographic tradition.

Oslyabya reportedly fought and survived the battle of Kulikovo, along with his son Yakov. There's no certainty if he survived the battle. According to some accounts, he did, and later participated in a diplomatic mission to the Byzantine Emperor in 1398. According to other accounts, he was killed in that battle. 

Oslyabya lies buried at the Theotokos Church in Simonovo, Moscow together with Peresviet. The Russian battleship Oslyabya was named after him.

References

Sources
In Russian language
 Благословение преподобного Сергия. Под редакцией В.Силовьева. Изд.совет РПЦ, 2005 
 Титов А. А. Предание о ростовских князьях. М., 1885
 Лошиц Ю. М. Дмитрий Донской., М., 1996
 Розанов Н. П. История церкви Рождества Пресвятые Богородицы на Старом Симонове в Москве. К её пятисотолетию (1370—1870). М., 1870

O
Russian knights